Pokémon Master Journeys: The Series is the twenty-fourth season of the Pokémon animated series, and the second season of Pokémon Journeys: The Series, known in Japan as Pocket Monsters (ポケットモンスター, Poketto Monsutā). The season premiered in Japan on December 11, 2020, on TV Tokyo; in Canada, the season premiered on Teletoon in June 2021, Télétoon in July 2021. and in the United States, it was released as a streaming television season with its first 12 episodes on September 10, 2021, on Netflix, with new episodes released on January 21, and May 26, 2022. The show released in India in Hindi from November 25, 2022. This season continues the research fellowship adventures of Ash Ketchum and Goh (Chloe sometimes joining them), as they travel across all eight regions, including the new Galar region from Pokémon Sword and Shield and the Galar region's Crown Tundra from Pokémon Sword and Shield: The Crown Tundra, based at Cerise Laboratory in Vermillion City in the Kanto region.

Its instrumental version serves as the ending theme.



Episode list

Notes

References 

2020 Japanese television seasons
2021 Japanese television seasons
2022 Japanese television seasons
Season 24
